The 1993 World Archery Championships was the 37th edition of the event. It was held in Antalya, Turkey on 8–12 September 1993 and was organised by World Archery Federation (FITA).

The event marked the last time that the compound discipline was not contested at the World Championships. The men's recurve competition was won for the first time by a Korean, Park Kyung-mo, instigating a run of 9 different Korean winners in 10 championships to 2011.

Medals summary

Recurve

Medals table

References

External links
 World Archery website
 Complete results

World Championship
World Archery
International archery competitions hosted by Turkey
World Archery Championships
Sport in Antakya
September 1993 sports events in Turkey